Taganka may refer to:
Taganka, a historic neighbourhood in Tagansky District of Moscow, Russia
Taganka Square in Moscow
Taganka Theatre in Moscow
Taganka Prison
Taganka (song)

See also
Tagansky (disambiguation)